Phthalane is a bicyclic aromatic organic compound.  It is also known as isocoumaran, or 1,3-dihydro-2-benzofuran.  One of derivatives of it is citalopram.  It can be oxidised to phthalic acid.

Isobenzofurans